Geert-Jan Marie Derikx (born October 31, 1980 in Den Bosch, North Brabant) is a field hockey player from the Netherlands, who won the silver medal with the Dutch national squad at the 2004 Summer Olympics in Athens.

The defender made his debut on May 1, 2002 in a friendly match against Germany: 1-1. He plays for Stichtse Cricket en Hockey Club in the Dutch League (Hoofdklasse), after a long time spell with HC Klein Zwitserland in The Hague. His younger brother Rob is also a member of the Dutch field hockey squad. In the summer of 2007 he moved to Amsterdam.

References

External links
 

1980 births
Living people
Dutch male field hockey players
Olympic field hockey players of the Netherlands
Field hockey players at the 2004 Summer Olympics
Field hockey players at the 2008 Summer Olympics
Olympic silver medalists for the Netherlands
Sportspeople from 's-Hertogenbosch
Olympic medalists in field hockey
Medalists at the 2004 Summer Olympics
SCHC players
HC Klein Zwitserland players
2006 Men's Hockey World Cup players
2010 Men's Hockey World Cup players
20th-century Dutch people
21st-century Dutch people